Lake Waikareiti, also spelt Lake Waikare Iti, is located in Te Urewera National Park in the North Island of New Zealand. A number of hiking trails are found within the catchment basin of the lake.

Its formation followed a landslide 18,000 years ago, in which a part of the landmass of 10 kilometers wide slid to the north-west. It is four kilometres to the northeast of the larger Lake Waikaremoana, into which it drains via the Aniwaniwa Stream. The smaller lake's surface is at an altitude of 880 metres above sea level - considerably higher than that of Waikaremoana - and as such the stream has several fine waterfalls such as the Aniwaniwa Falls and Papakorito Falls.

Several small islets are found in the lake. One of these, Rahui, itself contains a tiny lake - one of New Zealand's very rare lakes within lakes.

Numerous flora species are found within the lake catchment basin, crown fern (Blechnum discolor) being a widespread understory plant. An assortment of birds found in the North Island are present at the national park except for the weka.

References
 C. Michael Hogan. 2009. Crown Fern: Blechnum discolor, Globaltwitcher.com, ed. N. Stromberg
 New Zealand Department of conservation. 2009. Te Urewera National Park
 Charles Rawlings-Way, Carolyn Bain, Brett Atkinson, Errol Hunt, Peter Dragicevich and Sarah Bennett. 2008. New Zealand, Lonely Planet Publications, Edition 14, 

Notes

Wairoa District
Lakes of the Hawke's Bay Region